Pattom A. Thanu Pillai (15 July 188527 July 1970) was an Indian politician and freedom fighter who served as the 2nd Chief Minister of Kerala from 1960 to 1962. He was considered as a central figure in Kerala politics.

Early life 
Born in Thiruvananthapuram, A.Thanu Pillai was the son of Varadayyan and his wife Eswari Amma. Thanu Pillai earned his degree in law and started his legal practice as an advocate. Under the influence of his mentor A. Narayana Pillai, he was attracted towards the newly formed Travancore State Congress and he abandoned full-time practice in favour of agitating for responsible government. Following the Narayana Pillai sedition trial, he took over the leadership of Indian National Congress in the erstwhile princely state of Travancore.

Political career

Early politics 
Pattom Thanu Pillai remained as one of the leaders of Indian National Congress during the period when Kingdom of Travancore became an Independent state and later merged with Cochin to form Travancore-Cochin. On 3 June 1947, United Kingdom accepted demands for a partition and announced its intention to quit India within a short period. The Maharaja of Travancore desired to declare himself independent. Supported by the then Diwan, C. P. Ramaswami Iyer, Chithira Thirunal issued a declaration of independence on 18 June 1947. As Travancore's declaration of independence was unacceptable to India, negotiations were started with the Diwan by the Government of India. Family sources indicate that C. P., himself, was not in favour of independence but only greater autonomy and that a favourable agreement had been reached between C. P. and the Indian representatives by 23 July 1947 and accession to the Indian Union could not be carried out only because it was pending approval by the Raja. Nevertheless, an assassination attempt was made on C. P. on 25 July 1947 during a concert commemorating the anniversary of Swati Thirunal. C. P. survived with multiple stab wounds and hastened the accession of Travancore state to the Indian Union soon after his recovery.

Later politics 
After the accession of Travancore state to the Indian Union, P. G. N. Unnithan took over as the last Diwan of independent Travancore on 20 August 1947 following C. P. Ramaswami Iyer resigning as Diwan (subsequent to the attempt on Sir CP's life at the Swathi Thirunal Music Academy on 25 July 1947). P. G. N. Unnithan chaired the Travancore Constitutional Reforms Committee. He relinquished office on 24 March 1948 when a people's government led by Sri Pattom Thanu Pillai as Prime Minister took over. Pattom Thanu Pillai was the first Prime Minister of Independent Travancore state. He resigned as Prime Minister of Tranvacore on 17 October 1948. He was succeeded by Parur T. K. Narayana Pillai as the second and last Prime Minister of Travancore. After India's independence in 1947, Travancore and Cochin were merged to form Travancore-Cochin on 1 July 1949. It was originally called United State of Travancore and Cochin with Trivandrum as the capital. It was renamed State of Travancore-Cochin in January 1950 and was recognised as a state. During merger of Travancore and Cochin E. Ikkanda Warrier was the prime minister of the state of Cochin. Warrier resigned as the last prime minister of the state of Cochin on 30 June 1949 helping the merger of the two states. Parur T. K. Narayana Pillai was unanimously elected the leader of the Congress Legislature Party and he assumed charge as the first chief minister of Travancore-Cochin from 1 July 1949.

Positions and work 
First Ministry of the state of Travancore-Cochin headed by Parur T. K. Narayana Pillai resigned on 24 February 1951 following a corruption charge on the ministry. He was succeeded by C. Kesavan as the second Chief Minister of Travancore-Cochin. The first assembly of the state of Travancore-Cochin was dissolved on 12 March 1952 following the resignation of C Kesavan. Following the elections to the Legislative Assembly, held on 27 March 1952, A. J. John became the third Chief Minister of Travancore-Cochin. The second assembly of Travancore-Cochin lasted till 16 March 1954. By that time Pattom Thanu Pillai left Indian National Congress and joined Praja Socialist Party (PSP). In the election for the third Legislative Assembly of Travancore-Cochin held in 1954, Praja Socialist Party won 19 seats out of the contested 38 seats. Praja Socialist Party formed a coalition government along with the Indian National Congress who had won 45 seats. Pattom Thanu Pillai became the fourth Chief Minister of Travancore-Cochin with the support of Indian National Congress on 16 March 1954. He resigned on 10 February 1955 and was succeeded by Panampilly Govinda Menon as the last Chief Minister of Travancore-Cochin. He remained in office till 23 March 1956. After that the state remained under President's rule till 5 April 1957. During this time state of Kerala was formed. Under State Reorganisation Act of 1956, the four southern taluks of Travancore, namely Thovalai, Agasteeswaram, Kalkulam and Vilavancode and a part of the Chencotta Taluk was merged with Madras State. On 1 November 1956 Travancore-Cochin was joined with Malabar District of Madras State, the taluk of Kasaragod and South Kanara to form the new state of Kerala.

After the first ever elections to the Kerala Legislative Assembly in 1957, the Communist Party of India emerged as the single largest party. E M S Namboodiripad formed the first elected government with the support of 5 independent legislators. The government was not able to complete its full 5 year term. The Communist-led government was dissolved as a consequence of the movement known as the Vimochana Samaram (Liberation Struggle). The Communist government was dismissed on 31 July 1959 and President's rule was imposed in the state, under Article 356 of the constitution. Fresh elections were held in 1960 and Pattom A. Thanu Pillai became the second Chief Minister of Kerala, as head of a PSP-Congress-Muslim League coalition administration. He assumed office on 22 February 1960. However, he resigned as chief minister of Kerala on 26 September 1962 to make way for R. Sankar of the Indian National Congress as the next Chief Minister of the state. He was appointed Governor of Punjab on 1 October 1962 by the Central Government headed by Jawaharlal Nehru. Later he became Governor of Andhra Pradesh on 4 May 1964 and remained in office till 11 April 1968.

Resignation and death 
Two years after resigning as Governor of Andhra Pradesh, Pattom Thanu Pillai died on 27 July 1970, at the ripe old age of 85. His death occurred at his home in Thiruvananthapuram. He was cremated with full state honours at the premises of his home.

References

Further reading
 

1885 births
1970 deaths
People of the Kingdom of Travancore
Indian independence activists from Kerala
Indian National Congress politicians from Kerala
Chief Ministers of Kerala
Members of the Constituent Assembly of India
Governors of Andhra Pradesh
Governors of Punjab, India
Politicians from Thiruvananthapuram
Malayali politicians
Chief ministers from Indian National Congress
Kerala MLAs 1957–1959
19th-century Indian politicians
Members of the Travancore–Cochin Legislative Assembly
Praja Socialist Party politicians
Kerala MLAs 1960–1964